The Nigerien Football Federation (FENIFOOT) is the governing body of football in Niger. It organizes the national football league and the national team.

History
The FENIFOOT was founded in 1961, and affiliated to FIFA in 1964 and to CAF in 1965.

Crest

References

External links
 Official website
 Niger at the FIFA website.
 Niger at CAF Online

Niger
Football in Niger
Sports organizations established in 1961

es:Federación Nigeriana de Fútbol